Swedenborgian Church can refer to one of the following church denominations:
 The New Church (Swedenborgian), general term for Swedenborgian denominations
 Swedenborgian Church of North America, also known as the General Convention of the New Jerusalem
 General Church of the New Jerusalem, also known as the General Church
 Lord's New Church Which Is Nova Hierosolyma, also known as the Lord's New Church